SK Slavia Prague is a Czech professional football club founded in 1892 in the city of Prague. The club's first appearance in UEFA competitions was in the 1974–75 European Cup Winners' Cup. The club's best performance is reaching the semi-finals of the UEFA Cup, which they managed in the 1995–96 season.

This is the list of all SK Slavia Prague's European matches.

Overall record
Accurate as of 14 April 2022

Source: UEFA.comPld = Matches played; W = Matches won; D = Matches drawn; L = Matches lost; GF = Goals for; GA = Goals against; GD = Goal Difference.

Results

References

Europe
Czech football clubs in international competitions